Robert Blackwell (1918–1985) was an American bandleader.

Robert Blackwell may also refer to:

Robert Blackwell (1748–1831), American minister, surgeon, and slaveholder
Robert L. Blackwell (1895–1918), American soldier posthumously given the Medal of Honor
Robert J. Blackwell (born 1925), American civil servant
Robert Blackwell Jr., American businessman

See also
Robert Blackwill (born 1939), American diplomat and lobbyist